Enn Eesmaa (born 7 June 1946 in Tallinn) is an Estonian politician and former journalist. He is a member of XIV Riigikogu. Since 2003 he has belonged to the Estonian Centre Party.

From 1994-1996 he was director of EVTV, and from 1996-2003 he worked for TV3.

He has been member of X, XI, XII and XIII Riigikogu.

References

1946 births
21st-century Estonian politicians
Estonian Centre Party politicians
Estonian journalists
Living people
Members of the Riigikogu, 2003–2007
Members of the Riigikogu, 2007–2011
Members of the Riigikogu, 2011–2015
Members of the Riigikogu, 2015–2019
Members of the Riigikogu, 2019–2023
Politicians from Tallinn
Recipients of the Order of the White Star, 4th Class
Tallinn University alumni